Caetés (Caaetes) is a Brazilian municipality located within the state of Pernambuco, in northeastern Brazil. The city belongs to the mesoregion of Agreste Pernambucano and microregion of Garanhuns. It is the birthplace of the president of Brazil Luiz Inácio Lula da Silva. The name originates from the indigenous Caetés people who lived in Pernambuco in the 16th century.

Geography

 State: Pernambuco
 Region: Agreste (Pernambuco)
 Borders: Venturosa (N); Paranatama (S); Garanhuns and Capoeiras  (E); Pedra (W)
 Area: 330.5 km2
 Elevation: 849 m
 Hydrography: Mundaú, Ipanema and Una rivers
 Vegetation: Caatinga Hiperxerófila
 Climate: Mesothermal
 Annual average temperature - 20.6 °C
 Main roads: BR 101, BR 423 and BR 424
 Distance to Recife: 249 km

Economy

The main economic activities in Caetés are based in general commerce and the primary sector, which employs around 83% of the local workforce. The main products are especially manioc, beans, cattle and milk.

Economic Indicators

Economy by Sector
2006

Health Indicators

References

Municipalities in Pernambuco